This is a list of members of both houses of the Federal Assembly from the Canton of Jura. Until 1979, the area of Jura was part of the Canton of Bern and was represented as such.

Members of the Council of States

Members of the National Council

References

Lists of Members of the Swiss Federal Assembly by canton